Aunty Preethse is a 2001 Indian Kannada-language romantic comedy film. It is a remake of the 1995 Telugu film Aunty and stars Ananth Nag, Khushbu Sundar, Ramkumar and Anu Prabhakar. The film was dubbed into Tamil as Super Aunty with the comedy track of Tennis Krishna and Bank Janardhan filmed with Vadivelu and Vennira Aadai Moorthy.

Cast

Ananth Nag
Khushbu
Ramkumar
Anu Prabhakar
Balaraj
Anand
Ashalatha
Jyothi
Rekha Das
Pankaja
Sundar Raj
Doddanna
Tennis Krishna
Bank Janardhan
Mandeep Roy
Vadivelu as Krishnan (Tamil version)

Soundtrack
Soundtrack was composed by L. N. Shastry.
"Sneha Deepawali" - L. N. Shastry, Chithra
"Preethi" - Rajesh Krishnan, Suma Shastry
"Odu Thare" - Chithra
"Dayana" -L. N. Sastry

References

External links
Aunty Prthese

2001 films
Indian romantic comedy films
Kannada remakes of Telugu films
2000s Kannada-language films
2001 romantic comedy films